Barayev or Baraev (Russian: Бараев) is a masculine surname, its feminine counterpart is Barayeva or Baraeva. The surname may refer to:

Arbi Barayev (1974–2001), Chechen warlord
Movsar Barayev (1979–2002), Chechen warlord, nephew of Arbi
Zura Barayeva (died 2002), Chechen terrorist, wife of Arbi